Allyson Aires dos Santos (born 23 October 1990), commonly known as Allyson, is a Brazilian footballer who plays as a defender for Turkish club Ümraniyespor.

Career
Allison started his career in 2013 in Grêmio Barueri. On 23 January 2013 made his debut in the adult group. In the first six months of the 2013 season, he recorded 17 appearances, all of which were open. On 1 August 2013 he moved to Independente-SP Football Club, but made his debut in the group only at the beginning of the following season. On 6 February 2014, he scored his first career goal.

On 17 July 2015, he joined Maccabi Petah Tikva of the Israeli Premier League. On 22 August 2015 he made his debut for the team in a 0–1 win against Maccabi Netanya.

Honours

Club
Maccabi Petah Tikva  
 Toto Cup: 2015–16

External links

1990 births
Footballers from São Paulo
Living people
Brazilian footballers
Association football defenders
Grêmio Barueri Futebol players
Independente Futebol Clube players
Maccabi Petah Tikva F.C. players
Maccabi Haifa F.C. players
Bnei Yehuda Tel Aviv F.C. players
Bandırmaspor footballers
Ümraniyespor footballers
Israeli Premier League players
TFF First League players
Süper Lig players
Brazilian expatriate footballers
Expatriate footballers in Israel
Brazilian expatriate sportspeople in Israel
Expatriate footballers in Turkey
Brazilian expatriate sportspeople in Turkey